Bao Gang (born May 1969) is a Chinese politician of Mongolian ethnicity, currently serving as vice chairman of Inner Mongolia and party secretary of the capital city Hohhot.

Early life and education
Bao was born into a Mongolian family, in Fuxin County, Liaoning, in May 1969. In 1987, he entered Inner Mongolia University, majoring in national economic management. He earned his MBA from Tsinghua University in July 2009.

Career
Bao worked in government after university in 1991. Beginning in July 1991, he assumed various posts in the General Office of Inner Mongolia Autonomous Regional People's Government, including section member, deputy director, and director.

After a short period at the State Owned Assets Supervision and Administration Commission of Inner Mongolia Autonomous Region, in September 2006, he was appointed secretary of Hohhot Municipal Commission for Discipline Inspection, and was promoted to member of the standing committee of the CPC Hohhot Municipal Committee, the city's top authority. In January 2008, he was appointed vice mayor of Hohhot, but having held the position for only two years.

In September 2010, he was transferred to the regional center Wuhai city and appointed secretary of Wuhai Municipal Commission for Discipline Inspection, concurrently holding the deputy party secretary of Wuhai position.
In June 2013, he was promoted to acting mayor, confirmed in October of that same year.

In December 2013, he became acting mayor and deputy party secretary of Baotou, the largest city by urban population in Inner Mongolia abounds with rare earth minerals. He was installed as mayor on 11 January 2014.

He rose to become party secretary of Alxa League in September 2015. It would be his first job as "first-in-charge" of a prefecture level city.

In July 2018, he took the position of vice-chairman of Inner Mongolia, concurrently serving as party secretary of Hohhot since September 2021.

References

1969 births
Living people
Chinese people of Mongolian descent
People from Fuxin
Inner Mongolia University alumni
Tsinghua University alumni
People's Republic of China politicians from Liaoning
Chinese Communist Party politicians from Liaoning
Mayors of Wuhai
Mayors of Baotou